Abel Joseph Rodriguez Jr. (January 16, 1922 – July 17, 2010) was an American professional basketball player. He played for the Oshkosh All-Stars in the National Basketball League for eight games during the 1947–48 season and averaged 1.1 points per game.

References

1922 births
2010 deaths
American men's basketball players
Basketball players from San Jose, California
Guards (basketball)
Hartnell Panthers men's basketball players
Oshkosh All-Stars players
Professional Basketball League of America players